Garfit is a surname. Notable people with the surname include:

 Maude Garfit (1874–1948), English tennis player
 Thomas Garfit (1815–1883), English politician
 William Garfit (1840–1920), English banker and politician

See also
 Garfi (surname)